Auby is a commune in the Nord department in northern France.

It is a centre of zinc production and home to a plant owned by Nyrstar.

Population

Heraldry

International relations

Auby is twinned with Czeladź in Poland.

See also
Communes of the Nord department

References

External links

 Official website 

Communes of Nord (French department)